The Hive is a recording studio in North Hollywood, Los Angeles at 5500 Cahuenga Blvd, owned and run by the members of the alternative rock band 311.

Origin 
In 2000, after finishing touring for Soundsystem, the five members of 311 grew distraught with having to pay upwards of $2,000 a day in professional recording studios. Seeking a more independent-style place to work, they found a place in North Hollywood where they could record and pay rent of $3,000 a month. The band soon loaded in two 24 track analog tape machines and Pro Tools technology, fully furnished the place, and began working on their next album.

Recordings done at the Hive 
Prior to 311 purchasing The Hive, it was actively used as a music studio in the 1970s and 1980s. Notable acts such as Missing Persons and Adam Ant have recorded there. Just before 311 started using it, it was used as a voice-over studio for movies.

Since 311 moved into the studio, they have recorded and mixed six albums at The Hive; 2001's From Chaos, 2003's Evolver, 2005's Don't Tread on Me, 2009's Uplifter, 2011's Universal Pulse and 2014's Stereolithic. The band worked with producer Ron Saint Germain on From Chaos, Evolver, and Don't Tread on Me, while Bob Rock produced Uplifter and Universal Pulse, and Scott Ralston produced Stereolithic, making it the first time since 1999's Soundsystem that he produced a 311 album.

Other, lesser-known recording artists have also recorded sessions at The Hive, the most notable being the Volcom Entertainment act Pepper who recorded the minor-hit "Give It Up" at The Hive.

The Hive can be seen in more detail on the Enhanced CD features on From Chaos and Evolver.

References

External links 
 "L.A. Grapevine" by Maureen Droney - Mix Magazine (a look inside The Hive with Ron Saint Germain)
 Brief video tour of the recording studio

Recording studios in California
311 (band)